Kiril Ivanov Tenekedjiev (Bulgarian: Кирил Иванов Тенекеджиев; born 18 December 1960 in Varna, Bulgaria) is a professor in quantitative decision analysis and subjective statistics. His research achievements are in statistical pattern recognition, as well as his work on fuzzy-rational quantitative decision analysis and ribbon-risk analysis.

Personal details and aspirations
Kiril Tenekedjiev is the first of two children to Ivan Kirilov Tenekedjiev (a mechanical engineer), and Tatiana Museevna Tenekedjieva (a French language high school teacher).

Education and academic career 
Kiril Tenekedjiev obtained his mechanical engineering degree (both at Bachelor and master's degree) in ship machines and equipment from Technical University of Varna, Bulgaria in 1986. He was awarded a PhD degree in Engineering from Higher Attestation Commission of Bulgaria in 1994, undertaking his studies with Technical University - Varna. His Doctor of Sciences degree from 2004, awarded again by the Higher Attestation Committee of Bulgaria, was on a thesis entitled Decision Analysis: Utility Theory and Subjective Statistics. He was promoted to Full Professor again by the Higher Attestation Committee of Bulgaria while still employed by the Technical University of Varna, in 2008.

Kiril started his academic career in 1986 right after graduation from university. He worked as Researcher (operator) with the Ship propellers and cavitation unit of the Bulgarian Ship Hydrodynamics Center, Varna, Bulgaria (a research institute with industrial research orientation in mechanical engineering, hydrodynamics and cavitation). He worked on several research tasks there, related to his interests in mechanical engineering. After a year he moved to Technical University of Varna in 1987, where he was lecturer in the Department of Resistance of Materials. Following were series of academic positions with other sections of the Technical University of Varna from 1987 to 2011 (such as Department of Ship Machines and Equipment, Department of Technique and Technology for Water and Air Protection and some others), eventually spending some 12 years with the Department of Economics and Management, at that time part of the Faculty of Marine Sciences and Ecology. In 2011, he took a role as a Professor with the Faculty of Engineering, Department of Information Technologies of the Nikola Vaptsarov Naval Academy-Varna (Bulgaria). Since 2016, he is affiliated with the Australian Maritime College, University of Tasmania (Australia) as a professor in Systems Engineering in various capacities and roles.

Kiril has research interests spanning over quantitative decision analysis, subjective/applied statistics, simulation modelling,data analytics, mathematical modelling of biochemical reactions, statistical pattern recognition and technical diagnostics. His overarching research topic is intelligent systems and data analytics. He has found application areas to his novel works in medical research (biochemistry, blood coagulation, cardiology, cardio surgery), transport management (maritime transport, inland waterway transport), and business (economic decision analysis, risk management). Kiril served as visiting lecturer with the Medical University of Varna, and the Bulgarian Academy of Sciences. He has conducted specializations with the State University of New York (USA), Semmelweis University (Hungary) and Tokyo Institute of Technology (Japan), to name a few. His work is also associated with a multitude of international lecturing, research and specializations in Europe, Asia, North America and South America. Since 2013, Kiril served as representative of Bulgaria to the TFEU Program Committee "Smart, Green and Integrated Transport", Framework Program "Horizon 2020". Since early 2020, Kiril is the Chair of the Tasmanian subsection of the IEEE Victorian section, Australia on a two-year term. At the same time, he initiated his role as Division Committee Member for the Tasmanian Division of Engineers Australia.

Scholarships and awards
 In 2018, he became Fellow of Engineers Australia
In 2008 he became a Senior Member of IEEE.
 In 2007 he was awarded a Senior Scholarship from the Bulgarian American Foundation for Educational Exchange (Bulgarian Fulbright Commission) and was sent on research and lecturing specialization with Binghamton University, USA 2007, working under the supervision of Distinguished Professor George Klir
 In 2006 he was awarded certificate for a scientist, subject of biographical record in Who’s Who in the World, 23rd Edition 2006<ref</ref>
 In 2003 he served as Visiting Scholar with the Joint Research Centre of the European Commission, working for 9 months with the Institute for the Protection and Security of the Citizen, Ispra, Italy

References

External links
 Scholar Google

Living people
Academic staff of the Technical University of Varna
Bulgarian scientists
Bulgarian mathematicians
1960 births